is a private women's junior college in Ōgaki, Gifu, Japan, established in 1969.

External links
 Official website 

Educational institutions established in 1969
Private universities and colleges in Japan
Universities and colleges in Gifu Prefecture
1969 establishments in Japan
Japanese junior colleges
Women's universities and colleges in Japan
Ōgaki